Clear Spring is an unincorporated community in Owen Township, Jackson County, Indiana.

History
Clear Spring was platted in 1839. The community took its name from a spring near the original town site.

Geography

References

Unincorporated communities in Jackson County, Indiana
Unincorporated communities in Indiana